Yves Ravey (born 1953) is a French novelist and playwright. He was born in Besançon in 1953. Among his notable works is the novel Le Drap which won the Prix Marcel-Aymé in 2004.

Novels
 La Table des singes, roman (Gallimard, 1989). 
 Bureau des illettrés, roman (Minuit, 1992). 
 Le Cours classique, roman (Minuit, 1995). 
 Alerte, roman (Minuit, 1996). 
 Moteur, roman (Minuit, 1996). 
 Le Drap, roman (Minuit, 2003). 
 Pris au piège, roman (Minuit, 2005). 
 L'Épave, roman (Minuit, 2006).
 Bambi Bar, roman (Minuit, 2008).
 Cutter, roman (Minuit, 2009).
 Enlèvement avec rançon, roman (Minuit, 2010).
 Un notaire peu ordinaire, roman (Minuit, 2013).

References

French male novelists
1953 births
Living people
20th-century French novelists
21st-century French novelists
20th-century French male writers
21st-century French male writers